The Grand Almoner of France was an officer of the French monarchy and a member of the Maison du Roi ("King's Household") during the Ancien Régime. He directed the religious branch of the royal household (the Ecclesiastical Household) also known as the Royal Chapel.

The title "Grand Almoner" was created by King Francis I. The office was not included in the official list of Great Officers of the Crown of France established by Henri III in 1582, but some specialists of the French monarchy place the position among the Great Offices.

The Grand Almoner played above all a symbolic role as the most important member of the church in the royal court. Often having a church rank of bishop, more rarely that of cardinal, the Grand Almoner had a number of important privileges, including oversight of charity organizations in Paris and the right to the silver service of the royal chapel at the death of the king. The Grand Almoner also gave communion to the King and performed baptisms and princely marriages. The position was largely dominated by a few aristocratic families, such as by the House of Rohan.

The position was roughly equivalent to the position of Lord High Almoner in the United Kingdom, who oversees the U.K. Ecclesiastical Household and Chapel Royal.

See also
 Great Officers of the Crown of France
 Maison du Roi

References
This article is based on the article Grand aumônier de France from the French Wikipedia, retrieved on September 9, 2006.

External links
Great Officers of the Crown

Religion in the Ancien Régime
Court titles in the Ancien Régime
History of Catholicism in France